The Barcolana (slo.: Barkovljanka) is a historic international sailing regatta organized by the yacht club Società Velica di Barcola e Grignano. It takes place every year in the Gulf of Trieste on the second Sunday of October. The Barcolana is one of the most crowded regattas in the world. The Barcolana became the Guinness World Record holder in February 2019 when it was named "the greatest sailing race" with its 2,689 boats and over 16,000 sailors on the starting line.

Thanks to its particular formula, the Barcolana is a unique event on the international sailing stage: on the same starting line expert sailors and sailing lovers race side by side on boats of different sizes divided into several divisions according to their overall length.

History
The Barcolana was founded in 1969 thanks to the initiative of the yacht club Società Velica di Barcola e Grignano in Trieste. It has always taken place on the second Sunday of October to end the season of the yacht club, and therefore its full name is Barcolana Autumn Cup Regatta. During the first edition of the regatta, only 51 sailing boats from yacht clubs of Trieste took part in the race. Year after year the Barcolana has become more and more popular attracting international crews and world-famous sailors.

The course
The race takes place on a 15-mile four-sided, fixed mark course. The starting line is between the Miramare Castle and the seat of the Società Velica di Barcola e Grignano and for the first time in 2014 the finish line will be in the waters just off Piazza Unità d'Italia. Over the years the route has undergone several changes and for many years one buoy has floated in Slovenian waters.

Participation
The Barcolana is not an event for sailors only, but it involves the whole city of Trieste attracting tourists from abroad. Every year about 25,000 sailors take part in the race and more than 250,000 spectators watch the Barcolana from the Trieste seafront, known as the Rive, and from the Karst highland. Thanks to the particular conformation of the territory around the Gulf of Trieste, spectators can enjoy the race from numerous observation points as if sitting in a natural “sailing stadium”.

Side events
The Barcolana is not only the regatta on Sunday morning, but includes several events involving the sea and the city for ten days. In recent years several races and side events have taken place:
Land Rover Extreme 40: for the first time in 2014, the catamarans Extreme 40 of the Extreme Sailing Series will race for several days in the Gulf of Trieste;
Barcolana Young: a race on Optimist Class Boats dedicated to athletes aged between 8 and 15;
Barcolana Classic: a race for vintage and classic boats;
Barcolana by Night: the Ufo 28 one-design class boats will race by night just off Piazza Unità d'Italia;
Barcolana FUN: kitesurfers and windsurfers will race in the Bacino San Giusto, just off Piazza Unità d'Italia.

The Barcolana also includes several events on land:
Barcolanda Village: a village of stands along the Rive of Trieste offering food and wine areas, areas dedicated to the sponsors and exhibitions of technical equipment;
Barcolana in Music: several night concerts before the Barcolana;
FuoriRegata: local businesses organize events and activities including tastings, cultural and commercial events.

Cups and trophies
Several prizes are awarded during the prize-giving ceremony which usually takes place at the end of November. The spirit of many prizes goes beyond the mere sporting result and enhances sporting values and the origin of the event. 
Barcolana Trophy (permanent trophy): to the overall winner;
President of the Republic Trophy: to the overall winner;
Generali Trophy: to the winner in the Cruiser Class, the trophy is not awarded to race boats but only to “cruisers”;
Cups: to the first, the second and the third in each category; to the first, the second and the third in each Cruiser Class; to the first monotype boat belonging to a class with over 10 participants;
Fondazione CRTRIESTE Trophy: to the skipper of the first boat of the Trieste Province;
Port of Trieste Trophy: to the Italian boat that beats the highest number of boats in its category;
Italo-Austrian Friendship Trophy: to the first Austrian boat in the overall ranking;
City of Trieste Trophy: to the sailing club within the zone 13 with the highest number of entrants (excluding SVBG);
Fulvio Molinari Trophy: to the first boat owner in the overall ranking who participated in at least 20 Barcolana regattas;
IYFR Trophy (International Yachting Fellowship of Rotarians): to the first boat with a crew consisting of a Rotary member and at least one disabled member of a Paralympic Federation;
Giovanni Sigovich Trophy: to the first boat of the IX category (up to 6.45 m in length);
Fair Play Barcolana Trophy: to the boatowner who during the Barcolana distinguished himself/herself for fair play actions which best express the seafaring spirit of the event;
“Rose in the Wind” Trophy: to the first helmswoman of a boat with a mixed crew;
Boatowner of the Italian Navy League: to the first boat of the Italian Navy League.

Walk of Fame

See also 
Miramare Biosphere Reserve and Marine Reserve

References

External links
 Official site
 https://web.archive.org/web/20081015102108/http://in.ibtimes.com/articles/20081012/sailing-race-gulf-trieste-barcolana-regatta-italy.htm
 http://www.triest.it/en/node/20
 Regatta Images

Single day sailing competitions
Sports competitions in Italy
Recurring sporting events established in 1969
Sailing regattas
Sport in Trieste
Italian traditions